is a city located in Chiba Prefecture, Japan. , the city had an estimated population of  44,865 in 20,558 households and a population density of 410 persons per km2.

Geography
Tateyama is located at the far southern tip of the Bōsō Peninsula, facing the Pacific Ocean to the east and south, and the entrance to Tokyo Bay on the west. It is about 70 kilometers from the prefectural capital at Chiba, and within 70 to 80 kilometers from central Tokyo.

Neighboring municipalities
Chiba Prefecture
Minamibōsō

Climate
Tateyama has a humid subtropical climate (Köppen Cfa) characterized by warm summers and cool winters with light to no snowfall.

Demographics
Per Japanese census data, the population of Tateyama has declined in recent decades.

History
The area of present-day Tateyama was part of ancient Awa Province, dominated by the Satomi clan during the Sengoku period, who ruled from Tateyama Castle. After the start of the Meiji period, Tateyama Town (in Awa District), Chiba Prefecture was proclaimed on April 1, 1889 with the creation of the modern municipalities system. Tateyama annexed neighboring Toyosu Village on April 1, 1914, and merged with Hōjō Town to form Tateyamahōjō Town on April 18, 1933.

The city of Tateyama was proclaimed on November 3, 1939, with the merger of Tateyamahōjō with Nago and Funagata towns. The city was a base for the Imperial Japanese Navy Air Service until the end of World War II. Tateyama expanded on May 3, 1954 by annexing six surrounding villages.

Government
Tateyama has a mayor-council form of government with a directly elected mayor and a unicameral city council of 18 members. Tateyama contributes one member to the Chiba Prefectural Assembly. In terms of national politics, the city is part of Chiba 12th district of the lower house of the Diet of Japan.

Economy
The economy of Tateyama is based on commercial fishing, horticulture and summer tourism. The population of Tateyama surges during much of the summer. Tateyama is a popular destination for vacationing due to its proximity to Tokyo and its reputation as a "beach" or "surf town". There are numerous resort and holiday hotels dotting the coastline. Every August, tens of thousands of people gather on Hōjō Beach for the annual fireworks display.

Education
Tateyama has ten public elementary schools and three public middle schools operated by the city government, and three public high schools operated by the Chiba Prefectural Board of Education. The prefecture also operates four special education school for the handicapped. The National Tateyama Maritime Poly-technical School is located in Tateyama.

Transportation

Railway
 JR East –  Uchibō Line
  -  -

Highway

Airport
JMSDF Tateyama Air Base (no civilian traffic)

Sister city relations
 Bellingham, Washington, United States (Sister City since 1958) 
 Port Stephens, Australia (Friendship Cities from 1999 to 2009, sister cities since 2009)
 Fuefuki, Yamanashi, since May 1973

Local attractions
Tateyama Castle, reconstructed in 1982
Tateyama Municipal Museum
Nagisanoeki Tateyama, a branch of the city museum with materials from the former Chiba Prefectural Awa Museum
Nambo Paradise Botanical Garden
Awa Shrine, a Shinto shrine
Kannon Hall of Daifuku-ji, a Buddhist temple
Nago-dera, a Buddhist temple
Monument to Comfort women, Ōga District

Notable people
Tetsurō Sagawa, actor, voice actor
Toshi, musician
Yoshiki, musician
Ryota Ozawa, actor
Taira Uematsu, first ever non-player Japanese's coach in Major League Baseball

In popular culture
The popular television drama Beach Boys, which originally aired on Japanese television in the summer of 1997, although with a plot set in the Shōnan region, was filmed largely in Tateyama.

Notes

External links

Official Website 

 
Cities in Chiba Prefecture
Populated coastal places in Japan
Populated places established in 1939
1939 establishments in Japan